The Honey Island Swamp Monster, also known as the Cajun Sasquatch and in , is an ape-like humanoid cryptid creature, similar to descriptions of Bigfoot, purported to inhabit the Honey Island Swamp in St. Tammany Parish, Louisiana. It has become a part of Louisiana folklore, with many swamp tour companies in the area capitalizing on its alleged existence, which is considered unlikely by scientists.

Description
Other local names for the creature include the Rougarou, Louisiana Wookiee, and The Thing. Alleged plaster casts of footprints said to be from the creature showcase four toes; not a natural trait found in primates, who possess five.

Claims of its existence are generally not considered credible, including by scientists familiar with the area like ecologist Paul Wagner and his wife Sue. Neither they nor their Cajun guide, Robbie Charbonnet, report having seen any valid evidence beyond anecdotes and possible forgeries.

History
The first claimed sighting was in 1963 by Harlan Ford, a retired air traffic controller who had taken up wildlife photography. After his death in 1980, a reel of Super 8 film showing the creature was found among his belongings.

In 1974, Ford and his friend Billy Mills claimed to have found unusual footprints in the area, as well as the body of a wild boar whose throat had been gashed.

Today, the creature is still purported to inhabit the swamp and the bayous along the Pearl River. Local lore tells of a train crash that occurred near the swamp in the early 20th century in which a traveling circus lost chimpanzees who adapted to the environment and offer a potential explanation as to the creature's origins.

Popular culture
 The Honey Island Swamp monster was the subject of The Secret Saturdays episode "Ghost in the Machine" with its vocal effects provided by Dee Bradley Baker. The animated monster resembled a Bigfoot-like creature with crab-like claws.
 The creature was featured in an episode of Lost Tapes, "Swamp Creature."
 It was the subject of an episode of In Search of..., "The Swamp Monster."
 It was a subject of an episode of Fact or Faked: Paranormal Files, "Bayou Beast/River Ghost," showing Mr. Ford's original film. The investigators were able to recreate Ford's footage with a man dressed in a camouflage ghillie suit used by hunters. They deduced the film could simply be mistaken identity on Ford's part, but didn't rule out that such a creature could exist.
 An episode of Swamp People, "Full Moon Fever," includes a segment in which a group of people, Harlan Ford's granddaughter among them, are searching for the monster.
 The creature was featured in a segment of the series Monsters and Mysteries in America, "The Swamp." Super 8 footage of the monster was shown in the segment.
 It was featured in a segment of a 2012 episode of Mysteries at the Museum.
 On July 20, 2013, Mattel introduced the Monster High character Honey Swamp as the daughter of Honey Island Swamp monster at the 2013 San Diego Comic-Con International.
In 2019, an episode of America Unearthed titled "Bigfoot in the Bayou" investigated possible sightings. Presenter Scott Wolter concluded that the smell attributed to the creature was most likely methane produced by decomposing plants.
Eoin Colfer drew inspiration from the Honey Island Swamp monster for the character Vern in his novel Highfire.
A version of the Honey Island Swamp monster is included in the role-playing game supplement GURPS Monsters.

See also
 Fouke Monster
 Lake Worth Monster
 Lizard Man of Scape Ore Swamp
 Skunk ape

References

Louisiana folklore
American folklore
American legendary creatures
Bigfoot
Hominid cryptids